Cheiracanthium gratum is a spider species found in Germany and Hungary. It is pale yellow, with males growing to 5.6-6.5 mm in length and females 6.7-7 mm.

See also 
 List of Eutichuridae species

References

External links 

gratum
Spiders of Europe
Spiders described in 1897